Alpine Ski (アルパイン・スキ一) is an Alpine skiing arcade video game released by Taito in 1981. The player controls a skier who can move left, right, or increase forward speed. The aim is to maneuver a skier through a downhill course, a slalom, and a ski jumping competition in the shortest time possible. Two players can compete against each other.

Legacy
Alpine Ski was included in the Taito Legends 2 compilation and was later released on the Nintendo Switch in the Nintendo eShop on 30 May 2019 by Hamster Corporation as part of their Arcade Archives series.

References

External links 
 
 Alpine Ski at Arcade History

1981 video games
Arcade video games
Arcade-only video games
Skiing video games
Nintendo Switch games
PlayStation 4 games
Taito arcade games
Taito SJ System games
Video games developed in Japan
Hamster Corporation games
Multiplayer and single-player video games